The NOA building is a landmark 15-storey building located in Tokyo’s Azabu district in Minato. Designed by Japanese architect Seiichi Shirai, it was built in 1974. Facing Sakurada Street and Gaien-Higashi Street, the building is notable for its extensive use of brick stones and large entrance. It consists of a red-brick base of about 8 meters height and a copper sulfate shaped as an elliptical cylinder upper part with almost no windows (with only a full-length one on the 8th or 9th floor), and hosts the Embassy of Fiji. It has a height of 61.75 meters, with 15 floors above and 2 below ground.

The design of the building was entrusted to Seiichi Shirai by founder Yoshitsuru Nagao, whose real estate corporation was founded in 1969. The building was completed in 1974.

See also 

 Nakagin Capsule Tower
 Shizuoka Press and Broadcasting Center

References

External links 
 NOA building official webpage

Buildings and structures in Minato, Tokyo
Buildings and structures completed in 1974
Diplomatic missions of Fiji
Diplomatic missions in Tokyo
1974 establishments in Japan
Fiji–Japan relations